The Winston-Salem Fairgrounds (previously known as the Dixie Classic Fairgrounds) was a dirt oval track spanning  in addition to its primary purpose as a fairground. During the times of the year that it wasn't expected to host a stock car race, this fairground was the home of the annual Winston-Salem Fair/Dixie Classic Fair for Northwest North Carolina along with other events related to the Piedmont Triad area of North Carolina. The annual fair would traditionally take place in the first week of October.  On December 1, 1969, the Winston-Salem Foundation gave the Fairgrounds, the Memorial Coliseum, and $75,000 to the City of Winston-Salem.

Racing history

The race track component of the fairgrounds was used primarily for NASCAR-style stock car racing and was discarded by the Grand National Series after their 1955 season. Most of the races took place on either the summer or early autumn months; although one race took place after what is now called the Dixie Classic Fair (October 31, 1948).

Lee Petty won both the May 29 and August 7 unnamed Grand National Series races on this race course. Fred Dove would be notable for participating in his last NASCAR Cup Series career race on this track; he would finish in third place out of 23 competitors. Outside of the Cup Series, Fonty Flock (in his NASCAR modified vehicle), Curtis Turner (driving in a stock car race that preceded the NASCAR Cup Series), and Jack Harrison (driving in the SAFE Convertible Series) would win races at this ½-mile dirt oval. The SAFE (Society of Auto Sports, Fellowship, and Education) Convertible Series would eventually be bought out by NASCAR to become the NASCAR Convertible Division in 1955. However, even the NASCAR Convertible Series would be short-lived and become permanently disbanded after 1959. This was due to the fact that multiple sedan passenger automobiles could race on the track much more safely with the increasingly faster speeds than their convertible counterparts.

Both of the Cup Series races spanned  and the most expensive purse was $3,765 ($ when adjusted for inflation). Driving speeds of up to  could be sustained on this race track through single-car qualifying. Races would typically last less than two hours; with the longest race lasting one hour, fifty-nine minutes, and forty-four seconds.

All forms of automobile racing was discontinued on this track after 1963. The fate of motorcycle and horse racing on the track were left uncertain after the stock cars stopped racing in this venue.

References

External links
 Legends of NASCAR

Buildings and structures in Winston-Salem, North Carolina
Fairgrounds in the United States
Motorsport venues in North Carolina
NASCAR tracks
Tourist attractions in Winston-Salem, North Carolina